Neoconis is a genus of lacewing.

Species 
 Neoconis amazonica Meinander, 1983
 Neoconis bifurcata Meinander, 1974
 Neoconis bispina Meinander, 1972
 Neoconis brasiliensis Meinander, 1980
 Neoconis cubana (Banks, 1938)
 Neoconis dentata Meinander, 1972
 Neoconis garleppi (Enderlein, 1906)
 Neoconis gelesae Monserrat, 1981
 Neoconis inexpectata Meinander, 1972
 Neoconis insulana (Meinander, 1974)
 Neoconis marginata Meinander, 1972
 Neoconis paleocaribis† Grimaldi & Engel in Grimaldi, Engel, Nascimbene & Singh, 2013
 Neoconis pistrix (Enderlein, 1906)
 Neoconis presai Monserrat, 1983
 Neoconis szirakii Sarmiento-Cordero & Contreras-Ramos, 2019
 Neoconis tubifera Meinander, 1980
 Neoconis unam Monserrat, 1985
 Neoconis unicornis Meinander, 1990

References 

 Encyclopedia of Life entry

Coniopterygidae
Neuroptera genera